Beno Lapajne (born 10 June 1973) is a former professional handball player. He has taken part in many international events including the Athens Olympics in 2004 and Sydney Olympics in 2000.

He started his career in the handball club RK Inles – Ribnica. He later played in clubs Celje, Gorenje, Prule 67, US Ivry, Gold Club, Zagreb and BM Aragon. Lapajne has won 8 Slovenian Championships and 9 Slovenian Cups, 1 Croatian Championship and 1 Croatian Cup and was a runner-up at the 2004 European Men's Handball Championship.

References

External links 
 
 
 

1973 births
Living people
Handball players from Ljubljana
Slovenian male handball players
Olympic handball players of Slovenia
Handball players at the 2000 Summer Olympics
Handball players at the 2004 Summer Olympics
Liga ASOBAL players